Locustville is an unincorporated community in Accomack County, Virginia.  The postal code for Locustville is 23404. The Locustville Academy, constructed in 1859, was added to the National Register of Historic Places in 2016.

References

Unincorporated communities in Virginia
Unincorporated communities in Accomack County, Virginia